Fevers and Mirrors is the third studio album by the Nebraska indie band Bright Eyes, recorded in 1999 and released on May 29, 2000. It was the 32nd release of the Omaha, Nebraska-based record label Saddle Creek Records. The album was released later in 2000 in the United Kingdom as the inaugural release from Wichita Recordings.

The album begins with a recording of a little boy reading Mitchell Is Moving, a book by Marjorie Weinman Sharmat. "An Attempt to Tip the Scales" includes what is ostensibly an interview with the band's frontman, Conor Oberst. However, Oberst has admitted that the interview was something of a joke, intended to poke fun at the dark tone of the album. Conor's voice is impersonated in the interview by Todd Fink of The Faint and Commander Venus. The man interviewing is Matt Silcock, a former member of Lullaby for the Working Class.

The album was reissued alongside a six-track companion EP by Dead Oceans on May 27, 2022.

Critical reception

The music online magazine Pitchfork placed Fevers and Mirrors at number 170 on its list of top 200 albums of the 2000s, despite a low initial score of 5.4/10. In 2012, Pitchforks Ian Cohen gave the reissued version of the album a 9.0 out of 10.

Track listing

Personnel
 Conor Oberst – vocals, guitar (1, 4, 6, 8, 10-12), sample (1), organs (2), Rhodes (5), keyboards (5, 12), piano (6, 7), tremolo guitar (9), percussion (11), toy piano (12)
 Mike Mogis – electric guitar (4, 9), pedal steel (6, 8), vibraphone (1, 8), tambourine (6, 8), glockenspiel (1), piano (1), Ebow pedal steel (2), electronics (2, 9), tongue drum (3), guiro (3), lap dulcimer (4), hammered dulcimer (5), atmosphere (7), acoustic guitar intro (9), organ (9), mandolin (10), keyboards (10), samples (11), percussion (11)
 Todd Baechle – keyboards (3)
 Tim Kasher – accordion (1, 4, 6)
 Joe Knapp – drums (3, 4, 6, 8, 9), percussion (3), vocals (8)
 Jiha Lee – flute (2, 4, 10), vocals (5)
 Andy LeMaster – guitar (3), percussion (3, 6, 11), Mellotron (5, 6), bass (2, 5, 10), electric guitar (9), vocals (9-11), keyboards (11)
 Matt Maginn – bass (3, 4, 6, 8, 9)
 A.J. Mogis – piano (2), Rhodes (9)
 Clint Schnase – drums (2, 5, 10)

Charts

References

External links
Saddle Creek Records

2000 albums
Bright Eyes (band) albums
Saddle Creek Records albums
Wichita Recordings albums
Albums produced by Mike Mogis
Chamber pop albums
Britpop albums